Sudalai Madan  is a rural Dravidian folk tradition  deity worshipped predominantly in South India, particularly in the districts of Thoothukudi,  virudhunagar , Tirunelveli, Tenkasi, Kanyakumari, and Thiruvananthapuram. He is considered by adherents to be a son of Shiva and Parvati. He seems to have originated in some ancestral guardian spirit of the villages or communities in Tamil Nadu, in a similar manner as Ayyanar. He is regarded as a kaval deivam (guardian deity) who protects people against evil forces. Sudalai Madan is also called Madan thampuran, Chudala madan, or simply as Madan.

The deity Shiva is said to have created him and given him the name Sudalai Madan as the protector against evil forces, emanating from cemeteries and cremation grounds (sudalai). He is usually found with mother goddess Pechiamman, Brahmasakthi Amman, and Sudalai Mundan. Madathi is his consort.

Sudalai is the guardian of the kodimaram (flagstaff) in several temples.

Legend 
The tale of Sudalai Madan originate from the Dravidian folk tradition of South India. The goddess Parvati wishes to have a child; her husband Shiva suggests that she perform austerities to gain the same. Accordingly, Parvati pleases Shiva by her penance at the Ayiramkal Mandapam at Kailasha, the celestial abode of Shiva. He plucks a lock of hair, which started to burn as soon as he throws it. The fire spreads to her  (a part of the sari). From the fire, Sudalai Madan is born.

Parvati initially feeds the child with amrita (the nectar of immortality) instead of breast milk, making him immortal. The child desires solid food. He goes to the cremation grounds (sudalai) on Kailasha, and begins to eat the burning corpses. Since he had such a fondness for meat, Shiva instructs him to go to earth and protect humans. Offerings of cooked food and drink are expected be offered to him, seeking his favour.

Worship
The worship of this deity is primarily identified to be performed by members belonging to the lower classes of Hindu society. Often, Sudalai Madan statues are triangular pillar-like structures. Figured statues are stone carved. He is situated either in the open or under a simple roof. 

Sudalai is still venerated with customs that predate the Vedic religion or his syncretism with Shaivism, regarded as the rituals of the Dravidian folk religion. The devotees serve him non-vegetarian foods, which is against mainstream Hindu tradition. Goats, chickens, and pigs are sacrificed and served to him. Fridays are prescribed for his worship. His main festivals are conducted annually. These festivals are called "Kodai". Kodai is celebrated for one day to many days according to the devotees's needs. Some famous temples celebrate it for 10 days.

On these occasions, the deities are decorated with flowers. Some people are believed to become possessed and devotees talk to the deity through them. This deity is believed hunting in the cemetery through this spiritually possessed person. Thappattai beats, Kaniyan Koothu (Maguda Kacheri) and Villupattu are the main performances of Sudalai Madan Kodai festival.

Temples 
Temples of Sudalai Madan include:
Umarikadu sri Athankarai keela kovil umarikadu umarikadu tuticorin district
Arulmigu Sri Parvathi Amman Sudalaimadaswami Thirukoovil, (அருள்மிகு ஸ்ரீ பார்வதி அம்மன் ஸ்ரீ சுடலைமாடசுவாமி திருகோவில்) , Vadhuvarpatti, Virudhunagar (dt)
Arulmigu Mottagalunga Swamy tirukovil, (அருள்மிகு மொட்டகலுங்க சுவாமி திருக்கோயில்) Avudaiyannor, Tenkasi(dt)
Aatrangarai Sudalai madan ,Ilanji ,Tenkasi
Seevalaperi sudalai madan 
Kayathar sudalai madasamy kovil 
Arulmigu Shri Sudalai Eswarar Thirukovil, Maramangalam, Thoothukudi.(மாரமங்கலம் அருள்மிகு ஸ்ரீ சுடலை ஈஸ்வரர் திருக்கோவில்)
 Sri Karayadi Sudalai Madaswamy, Pechiamman Temple, Sathankulam
 மயிலாடும்பாறை சுடலை ஆண்டவர் ஆலயம், முதலைக்குளம், திருநெல்வேலி
 Otha Panai Sudalai Madan Swami Temple, Sirumalanchi
 High Court Maharaja Temple, Arumuga Mangalam, Thoothukudi 
 Arulmigu Sri Sudalai Eswarar Temple, pallapalayam, udumalpet
 Vijayanarayanapuram
 Oosikattu/Ooikattu Sudalai Madan Temple
 Palavur, Arulmigu Sudalai Kovil
 Ozhuginaseri Masana Sudalai Temple
Kurichi Sudalai Madan Temple, Suchindrum
 Maha SivaSudalai Temple, Colachel and the entire region of Tirunelveli, Tuticorin and Kanniyakumari district
 Vaigai Sri Sudalaimadasami Temple, Kilakkarai (Ramnanathapuram District)
 PUDUPATI ARULMIGU PERIYA OORANI SUDALAI (Alangulam Tirunelveli District)
 Sudalai Madan Temple in Gopalasumdram
 SullaKarai Sudalai Madaswamy Andipatti, Alangulam, Tirunelveli District
 Arulmigu Sri Sudalai Mada Swami Temple, Irulappapuram, Kanyakumari District
 Adukkupeeda Sudalai Madaswamy, Sinthamani, Tirunelveli District
 Arulmigu Valli Vaikkal Sudali Madan Swamy Temple, Arumuganeri, Thoothukudi District
 Arulmigu Poonankundru Siva Sudalai Madaswamy kovil, Therkusalai, Agastheeswaram, Kanyakumari, Tamil Nadu. 
 Sri Sudalai Madanthambiran Swamy Temple, Navalady, Tirunelveli district. 
 Arulmigu kalathu kovil Sudalai madan swamy kovil, Vellamadam, Kanyakumari.
Arulmigu Athiadi Sudalaimadan kovil, athiputhur, Tirunelveli Dt.
Sudalai Kovil, Palazvur, Tirunelveli
Madan Kovil,

Outside India
Madan is popular amongst the Tamil diaspora in Sri Lanka, Singapore, Malaysia, Réunion and French overseas territories in the Caribbean sea.

References

 Sudalai Madan amongst Indian origin Tamils
 South Indian Deities And Their Relative Following in Tamil Nadu
 Secularism and Religious Violence in Contemporary India

..

Tamil deities
Regional Hindu gods